Per Osland is a Norwegian physicist specializing in theoretical particle physics. He is a professor emeritus at the University of Bergen.

Education and career
Osland earned a degree in physics from the Norwegian Institute of Technology in 1968, and completed a Ph.D. at the University of Trondheim in 1975. He became a professor at the University of Bergen in 1987.

Book
He is the coauthor with Roy J. Glauber of the book Asymptotic Diffraction Theory and Nuclear Scattering (Cambridge University Press, 2019).

Recognition
Osland was elected to the Royal Norwegian Society of Sciences and Letters in 1989. He was president of the Norwegian Physical Society from 2010 to 2013.

References

External links

Year of birth missing (living people)
Living people
Norwegian physicists
Norwegian Institute of Technology alumni
Academic staff of the University of Bergen
Royal Norwegian Society of Sciences and Letters